The Drama League Awards, created in 1922, honor distinguished productions and performances both on Broadway and Off-Broadway, in addition to recognizing exemplary career achievements in theatre, musical theatre, and directing. Each May, the awards are presented by The Drama League at the Annual Awards Luncheon with performers, directors, producers, and Drama League members in attendance. The Drama League membership comprises the entire theater community, including award-winning actors, designers, directors, playwrights, producers, industry veterans, critics and theater-going audiences from across the U.S.

The Drama League Awards are the oldest awards honoring theater in North America. The awards were established in 1922, and formalized in 1935. Katharine Cornell was the recipient of the first award in 1935, for Distinguished Performance. Seven competitive awards are presented: Outstanding Production of a Play, Outstanding Production of a Musical, Outstanding Revival of a Play, Outstanding Revival of a Musical, the Distinguished Performance Award, and, as of 2022, Outstanding Direction of a Play and Outstanding Direction of a Musical. The Distinguished Performance Award is presented to one performer every year, and the recipient can only receive the award once in his or her career. The Drama League also bestow three special honors at the awards ceremony: Distinguished Achievement in Musical Theater, Unique Contribution to the Theater, and The Founders Award for Excellence in Directing. The award statues are designed by New York firm Society Awards.

Categories of awards
 Outstanding Production of a Play
 Outstanding Production of a Musical
 Outstanding Revival of a Play
 Outstanding Revival of a Musical
 Outstanding Direction of a Play (added in 2022)
 Outstanding Direction of a Musical (added in 2022)
 Distinguished Performance

Additionally, an honorary award may be given in the following categories:
 Distinguished Achievement in Musical Theatre
 Unique Contribution to the Theatre
 The Founders Award for Excellence in Directing

List of winners
The Distinguished Performer Award was first presented in 1935, to Katharine Cornell for Romeo and Juliet. The first recipient of the Founders Award for Excellence in Directing was Daniel J. Sullivan in 2000. Actor Yul Brynner was the first recipient of the Distinguished Achievement in Musical Theatre award in 1985. The Unique Contribution to the Theatre Award was first bestowed in 1982 to the New York Production of Nicholas Nickelby: Bernard Jacobs, Gerald Schoenfeld, James M. Nederlander, Elizabeth McCann, and Nelle Nugent.

Winners 2021–2022

Source: Playbill.com

 Sutton Foster for The Music Man – Distinguished Performance Award
 A Strange Loop – Outstanding Production of a Musical
 The Lehman Trilogy – Outstanding Production of a Play
 Company – Outstanding Revival of a Musical
 Take Me Out – Outstanding Revival of a Play
 Marianne Elliott for Company – Outstanding Direction of a Musical
 Kate Whoriskey for Clyde's – Outstanding Direction of a Play
 Hugh Jackman – Distinguished Achievement in Musical Theatre Award
 Billy Crystal – Unique Contribution to the Theatre
 Lileana Blain-Cruz – Founders Award for Excellence in Directing

Winners 2019–2020

Source: Playbill.com

 Danny Burstein for Moulin Rouge! – Distinguished Performance Award
 Moulin Rouge! – Outstanding Production of a Musical
 The Inheritance – Outstanding Production of a Play
 Little Shop of Horrors – Outstanding Revival of a Musical
 A Soldier's Play – Outstanding Revival of a Play
 James Lapine – Distinguished Achievement in Musical Theatre Award
 Terrence McNally – Unique Contribution to the Theatre
 Marianne Elliott – Founders Award for Excellence in Directing

Winners 2018–2019

Source: Playbill.com

 Bryan Cranston for Network – Distinguished Performance Award
 Hadestown – Outstanding Production of a Musical
 The Ferryman – Outstanding Production of a Play
 Kiss Me, Kate – Outstanding Revival of a Musical
 The Waverly Gallery – Outstanding Revival of a Play
 Kelli O'Hara – Distinguished Achievement in Musical Theatre Award
 Taylor Mac – Unique Contribution to the Theatre
 Alex Timbers – Founders Award for Excellence in Directing

Winners 2017–2018

Source: Playbill.com

 Glenda Jackson for Three Tall Women – Distinguished Performance Award
 The Band's Visit – Outstanding Production of a Musical
 Harry Potter and the Cursed Child – Outstanding Production of a Play
 My Fair Lady – Outstanding Revival of a Musical
 Angels in America – Outstanding Revival of a Play
 Idina Menzel – Distinguished Achievement in Musical Theatre Award
 National Endowment for the Arts – Unique Contribution to the Theatre
 Casey Nicholaw – Founders Award for Excellence in Directing

Winners 2016–2017
Source: Playbill.com

 Ben Platt for Dear Evan Hansen – Distinguished Performance Award
 Dear Evan Hansen – Outstanding Production of a Musical
 Oslo – Outstanding Production of a Play
 Hello, Dolly! – Outstanding Revival of a Musical
 Jitney – Outstanding Revival of a Play
 Bette Midler – Distinguished Achievement in Musical Theatre Award
 Bill Berloni – Unique Contribution to the Theatre
 Michael Greif – Founders Award for Excellence in Directing

Winners 2015–2016
Source: Playbill.com

 Lin-Manuel Miranda for Hamilton – Distinguished Performance Award
 Hamilton – Outstanding Production of a Musical
 The Humans – Outstanding Production of a Play
 The Color Purple – Outstanding Revival of a Musical
 A View from the Bridge – Outstanding Revival of a Play
 Sheldon Harnick – Distinguished Achievement in Musical Theatre Award
 Deaf West Theatre – Unique Contribution to the Theatre
 Ivo van Hove – Founders Award for Excellence in Directing

Winners 2014–2015
Source: Playbill.com

 Chita Rivera for The Visit – Distinguished Performance Award
 An American in Paris – Outstanding Production of a Musical
 The Curious Incident of the Dog in the Night-Time – Outstanding Production of a Play
 The King and I – Outstanding Revival of a Musical
 You Can't Take It with You – Outstanding Revival of a Play
 Joel Grey – Distinguished Achievement in Musical Theater Award
 Neal Shapiro and David Horn – Unique Contribution to the Theater Award
 Stephen Daldry – Founders Award for Excellence in Directing

Winners 2013–2014
Source: Playbill.com

 Neil Patrick Harris for Hedwig and the Angry Inch – Distinguished Performance Award
 A Gentleman's Guide to Love and Murder – Outstanding Production of a Musical
 All the Way – Outstanding Production of a Play
 Hedwig and the Angry Inch – Outstanding Revival of a Musical
 The Glass Menagerie – Outstanding Revival of a Play
 Barbara Cook – Distinguished Achievement in Musical Theatre Award
 Key Brand Entertainment/Broadway Across America: John Gore – Unique Contribution to the Theatre Award
 John Tiffany – The Founders Award for Excellence in Directing

Winners 2012–2013
Source: Playbill.com

 Nathan Lane for The Nance – Distinguished Performance Award
 Vanya and Sonia and Masha and Spike – Outstanding Production of a Play
 Kinky Boots – Outstanding Production of a Musical
 Who's Afraid of Virginia Woolf? – Outstanding Revival of a Play
 Pippin – Outstanding Revival of a Musical
 Bernadette Peters – Distinguished Achievement in Musical Theatre Award (presented by Joel Grey)
 Madison Square Garden Entertainment & the Rockettes – Unique Contribution to the Theatre Award (Presented by Tommy Tune)
 Jerry Mitchell – The Founders Award for Excellence in Directing (Presented by Cyndi Lauper)

Winners 2011–2012
Source: Playbill.com

 Audra McDonald for Porgy and Bess – Distinguished Performance Award
 Other Desert Cities – Outstanding Production of a Play
 Death of a Salesman – Outstanding Revival of a Play
 Once – Outstanding Production of a Musical
 Follies – Outstanding Revival of a Musical
 Alan Menken – Distinguished Achievement in Musical Theatre Award
 Rosie O'Donnell – Unique Contribution to the Theatre Award
 Diane Paulus – The Founders Award for Excellence in Directing (formerly the Julia Hansen Award)

Winners 2010–2011
Source: Playbill.com

 Mark Rylance for Jerusalem and La Bête – Distinguished Performance Award
 War Horse – Outstanding Production of a Play
 The Book of Mormon – Outstanding Production of a Musical
 The Normal Heart – Outstanding Revival of a Play
 Anything Goes – Outstanding Revival of a Musical
 Whoopi Goldberg – Unique Contribution to the Theatre Award
 Liza Minnelli – Distinguished Achievement in Musical Theatre Award
 Susan Stroman – Founders Award for Excellence in Directing.

Winners 2009–2010
Source: Playbill.com

 Alfred Molina for Red – Distinguished Performance Award
 Sondheim on Sondheim – Outstanding Production of a Musical
 Red – Outstanding Production of a Play
 La Cage aux Folles – Outstanding Revival of a Musical
 A View from the Bridge – Outstanding Revival of a Play
 Nathan Lane – Distinguished Achievement in Musical Theatre Award
 Kenny Leon – Founders Award for Excellence in Directing
 Macy's Parade and Entertainment Group – Unique Contribution to the Theatre

Winners 2008–2009
Source:Playbill.com

 Geoffrey Rush for Exit the King – Distinguished Performance Award
 God of Carnage, by Yasmina Reza – Outstanding Production of a Play
 Billy Elliot The Musical, Music by Elton John; Book and Lyrics by Lee Hall – Outstanding Production of a Musical
 Blithe Spirit, by Noël Coward – Outstanding Revival of a Play
 Hair, Music by Galt MacDermot; Book, Lyrics by Gerome Ragni, James Rado – Outstanding Revival of a Musical
 Elton John – Distinguished Achievement in Musical Theatre Award
 Arthur Laurents – Founders Award for Excellence in Directing
 Angela Lansbury – Unique Contribution to the Theatre
 Herb Blodgett – The 75th Anniversary Leadership Award

Winners 2007–2008
Source:Variety

 Patti LuPone for Gypsy – Distinguished Performance Award
 August: Osage County by Tracy Letts – Outstanding Production of a Play
 A Catered Affair, Book by Harvey Fierstein; Music and Lyrics by John Bucchino – Outstanding Production of a Musical
 Macbeth by William Shakespeare – Outstanding Revival of a Play
 South Pacific, Book by Joshua Logan and Oscar Hammerstein II, Music by Richard Rodgers; Lyrics by Oscar Hammerstein II – Outstanding Revival of a Musical
 Paul Gemignani – Distinguished Achievement in Musical Theatre Award
 Bartlett Sher – Founders Award for Excellence in Directing
 Ellen Stewart – Unique Contribution to the Theatre

Winners 2006–2007

 Liev Schreiber for Talk Radio and Macbeth – Distinguished Performance Award
 The Coast of Utopia – Outstanding Production of a Play
 Spring Awakening – Outstanding Production of a Musical
 Journey's End – Outstanding Revival of a Play
 Company – Outstanding Revival of a Musical
 John Kander and Fred Ebb – Distinguished Achievement in Musical Theatre
 Michael Mayer – Founders Award for Excellence in Directing
 Broadway Cares/Equity Fights Aids – Unique Contribution to the Theatre

Winners 2005–2006

 Christine Ebersole for Grey Gardens – Distinguished Performance Award
 The History Boys – Outstanding Production of a Play
 Jersey Boys – Outstanding Production of a Musical
 Awake and Sing! – Outstanding Revival of a Play
 Sweeney Todd – Outstanding Revival of a Musical
 Patti LuPone – Distinguished Achievement in Musical Theatre
 Marian Seldes – Unique Contribution to the Theatre
 Des McAnuff- Founders Award for Excellence in Directing

Winners 2004–2005

 Norbert Leo Butz for Dirty Rotten Scoundrels – Distinguished Performance Award
 Doubt – Outstanding Production of a Play
 Dirty Rotten Scoundrels – Outstanding Production of a Musical
 Twelve Angry Men – Outstanding Revival of a Play
 La Cage aux Folles – Outstanding Revival of a Musical
 BMI Musical Theatre Workshop – Distinguished Achievement in Musical Theatre
 The Billy Rose Theatre Collection at the New York Public Library at Lincoln Center – Unique Contribution to the Theatre
 Mike Nichols – Founders Award for Excellence in Directing

Winners 2003–2004

 Hugh Jackman for The Boy from Oz– Distinguished Performance Award
 I Am My Own Wife – Outstanding Production of a Play
 Wicked – Outstanding Production of a Musical
 Henry IV – Outstanding Revival of a Play
 Assassins – Outstanding Revival of a Musical
 Donna Murphy – Distinguished Achievement in Musical Theatre
 City Center Encores – Unique Contribution to the Theatre
 George C. Wolfe – Founders Award for Excellence in Directing

Winners 2002–2003

 Harvey Fierstein for Hairspray – Distinguished Performance Award
 Take Me Out – Outstanding Production of a Play
 Hairspray – Outstanding Production of a Musical
 A Day in the Death of Joe Egg – Outstanding Revival
 Twyla Tharp – Distinguished Achievement in Musical Theatre
 Roundabout Theatre Company: Todd Haimes – Unique Contribution to the Theatre
 Joe Mantello – Founders Award for Excellence in Directing

Winners 2001–2002

 Metamorphoses – Outstanding Production of a Play
 Urinetown – Outstanding Production of a Musical
 The Crucible – Outstanding Revival
 Liam Neeson for The Crucible – Distinguished Performance Award
 Elaine Stritch – Distinguished Achievement in Musical Theatre
 Julia Hansen – Unique Contribution to the Theatre
 Sir Richard Eyre – Founders Award for Excellence in Directing

Winners 2000–2001

 Proof – Outstanding Production of a Play
 The Producers – Outstanding Production of a Musical
 One Flew Over the Cuckoo's Nest – Outstanding Revival
 Mary-Louise Parker for Proof and Gary Sinise for One Flew Over the Cuckoo's Nest – Distinguished Performance Award
 Susan Stroman – Distinguished Achievement in Musical Theatre
 Steppenwolf Theatre Company: Terry Kinney, Jeff Perry, Gary Sinise – Unique Contribution to the Theatre
 Jack O'Brien – Founders Award for Excellence in Directing

Winners 1999–2000

 Copenhagen – Outstanding Production of a Play
 Contact – Outstanding Production of a Musical
 Kiss Me, Kate – Outstanding Revival
 Eileen Heckart for The Waverly Gallery – Distinguished Performance Award
 Audra McDonald – Distinguished Achievement in Musical Theatre
 Actors Theatre of Louisville: Jon Jory – Unique Contribution to the Theatre
 Daniel Sullivan – Founders Award for Excellence in Directing

Winners 1998–1999

 Wit – Outstanding Production of a Play
 Fosse – Outstanding Production of a Musical
 Death of a Salesman – Outstanding Revival
 Kathleen Chalfant for Wit – Distinguished Performance Award
 Ann Reinking and Gwen Verdon – Distinguished Achievement in Musical Theatre
 Sir David Hare – Unique Contribution to the Theatre

Winners 1997–1998

 The Beauty Queen of Leenane – Outstanding Production of a Play
 Ragtime – Outstanding Production of a Musical
 Cabaret – Outstanding Revival
 Brian Stokes Mitchell for Ragtime – Distinguished Performance Award
 Julie Taymor – Distinguished Achievement in Musical Theatre
 The Brooklyn Academy of Music: Harvey Lichtenstein – Unique Contribution to the Theatre

Winners 1996–1997

 The Last Night of Ballyhoo – Outstanding Production of a Play
 The Life – Outstanding Production of a Musical
 Chicago – Outstanding Revival
 Charles Durning for The Gin Game and Bebe Neuwirth for Chicago – Distinguished Performance Award
 Gerard Alessandrini – Distinguished Achievement in Musical Theatre
 Jason Robards – Unique Contribution to the Theatre

Winners 1995–1996

 Seven Guitars – Outstanding Production of a Play
 Rent – Outstanding Production of a Musical
 A Delicate Balance – Outstanding Revival
 Uta Hagen for Mrs. Klein – Distinguished Performance Award
 George C. Wolfe – Distinguished Achievement in Musical Theatre
 The 42nd Street Development Project, The New 42nd Street, The Walt Disney Company, Livent – Unique Contribution to the Theatre

Winners history
List of winners, 1935 through 2014.

See also
 Tony Award
 Drama Desk Awards
 Obie Award
 New York Drama Critics Award

References

External links

 

American theater awards